Jil Walton (born July 5, 1966) is an American equestrian. She competed in two events at the 1992 Summer Olympics.

References

External links
 

1966 births
Living people
American female equestrians
Olympic equestrians of the United States
Equestrians at the 1992 Summer Olympics
People from Arcadia, California
21st-century American women